Magnolia foveolata is a species of plant in the family Magnoliaceae native to China and Vietnam.

References

foveolata
Trees of Vietnam
Trees of China
Taxonomy articles created by Polbot